Weißenkirchen in der Wachau is a town in the district of Krems-Land in the Austrian state of Lower Austria.
The ferry across the Danube here is interesting in that it has no motor or sail: it is powered by rudder set against the river current, anchored to a cable above the river.  The ferry carries passengers, bicycles, motorcycles, and automobiles.

Population

References

 

Cities and towns in Krems-Land District